Ban Mo may refer to:

บ้านหมอ
 Ban Mo District in Saraburi Province

บ้านหม้อ
 Ban Mo, Bangkok a street and neighbourhood in Bangkok
 Ban Mo Subdistrict in Mueang Phetchaburi District
 Ban Mo Subdistrict in Phrom Buri District, Sing Buri
 Ban Mo Subdistrict in Si Chiang Mai District, Nong Khai
 Ban Mo, Uttaradit, a subdistrict in Phichai District, Uttaradit